Tongnan Baizi (sometimes mistakenly called Bozi) is a town in Chongqing, China. It consists of wide streets and private farms. It was built in the early Song dynasty, making it one of the oldest towns in the world.

Location 
It takes 40 minutes to arrive in Suining. It is located in the annular structural unit of the Long Nu Temple in the upper Yangtze Platform, Sichuan Zhongtai Au, and Sichuan Zhongtai Arch. The fertile pure soil accounts for 80% arable land since it is next to a river.

Land resources 
Baizi includes  of arable land.  The soil consists of 1.35% organic matter and 2.55% of potassium.

Water resources 
Along with the river, residents can rely on ponds and creeks that are usually safe to drink. However, as of December 2016 the creeks and the ponds are now contaminated with mud and pollution.

Economy 
The town has a total social fixed assets investment of 487 million yuan with an increase of 32%. The total retail sales are 14.84 billion yuan. The per capita net income of farmers grew to 12,260 yuan which is an increase of 18%. The town makes most of its money through agriculture. The town has a few hotels and stores.

Leadership and laws 
Leadership is led by two men: Hu Guangjian and Liu Ming who were born in 1969 and 1964 respectively. Liu Ming is currently the mayor of Tongnan. It is legal to use and buy firecrackers and fireworks which are only limited to the country.

Education
Baizi has a middle school and an elementary school. The middle school was built around 1930 and is close to a lake. Both schools got new refurbishments. The middle school originally consisted of one building and one dorm but has increased. The elementary school has upgraded technology.

Climate 
The town has a mixed climate, with monsoons and sunshine. The average frost period is 5.5 days.

Cases 
In 2013, heavy rainstorms flooded the town. Approximately 18,000 people were evacuated. The monsoon season began in 2010. In 2010, 12,300 people were rescued in Baizi and two other towns. Baizi received  of rainfall and the floodwater destroyed 128 houses. This inflicted an economic loss of 13.8 million yuan. The Tongnan County government reported at least 600 residents were trapped in the three towns.

Resources 

Song dynasty
Towns in Chongqing